The Tony Award for Best Revival of a Play has only been awarded since 1994. Prior to that, plays and musicals were considered together for the Tony Award for Best Revival. The award is given to the best non-musical play that has appeared on Broadway in a previous production. The award goes to the producers of the play.

Winners and nominees

1990s

2000s

2010s

2020s

Award records

Multiple wins
 2 Wins
 Death of a Salesman 
 A View from the Bridge

Multiple nominations
 3 Nominations
 A View from the Bridge 
 2 Nominations
 A Raisin in the Sun
 Betrayal
 Death of a Salesman 
 Frankie and Johnny in the Clair de Lune
 The Iceman Cometh 
 Inherit the Wind
 Long Day's Journey into Night
 Noises Off
 Present Laughter
 The Best Man
 The Crucible
 Twelfth Night
 Who's Afraid of Virginia Woolf?

Multiple author wins
 4 Wins
 Arthur Miller

 2 Wins
 Edward Albee
 August Wilson

Multiple author nominations

 9 Nominations
 Arthur Miller
 William Shakespeare

 6 Nominations
 Eugene O'Neill

 5 Nominations
 Edward Albee

 4 Nominations
 Tom Stoppard

 3 Nominations
 Noël Coward
 George S. Kaufman
 Kenneth Lonergan
 Terrence McNally
 Harold Pinter
 August Wilson

 2 Nominations
 Edna Ferber
 Michael Frayn
 Brian Friel
 Lorraine Hansberry
 Jerome Lawrence
 David Mamet
 Clifford Odets
 Robert E. Lee
 Gore Vidal
 Tennessee Williams

See also
 Tony Award for Best Play
 Drama Desk Award for Outstanding Revival of a Play
 Laurence Olivier Award for Best New Play

References

External links
 The American Theatre Wing's Tony Awards official website

Tony Awards
Awards established in 1994
1994 establishments in New York City